Sainte-Eulalie-de-Cernon is a commune in the southern French department of Aveyron.

At the heart of the historic settlement is the Commandery of Saint Eulalia, a hospital (in the medieval sense of the word) established by the Order of the Knights Templar. After that Order was disbanded by Philip IV of France in 1307-08, royal forces were sent to close the hospital down, and from that event a detailed account of the buildings, their contents, both in the chapel and in the secular parts of the complex, and the life and customs of the occupants, has survived.

The Commandery came under the control of the Knights Hospitallers during the Hundred Years War and survived until its final destruction as a result of the French Revolution towards the end of the eighteenth century.

Many medieval buildings survive, together with later ones, inside high defensive walls.

Population

See also
Communes of the Aveyron department

Notes and references

Communes of Aveyron
Aveyron communes articles needing translation from French Wikipedia